Somethin Els is the tenth studio album by Scottish musician Jack Bruce. The album was released on 23 February 1993 by CMP Records. It features the first appearance of Bruce's old Cream bandmate Eric Clapton on one of his solo albums.

Track listing 
All tracks composed by Jack Bruce and Pete Brown; except where indicated

Personnel
Jack Bruce - vocals, bass, piano, keyboards, cello, drums, percussion
Eric Clapton, Clem Clempson, Peter Weihe, Ray Gomez - guitar
Stuart Elliott, Anton Fier - drums
Trilok Gurtu, Mark Nauseef - percussion
Dave Liebman, Dick Heckstall-Smith, Uli Lask, Gerd Dudek - saxophone
Bruce Fowler - trombone
Walt Fowler - trumpet
Maggie Reilly - backing vocals

References

Jack Bruce albums
1993 albums